Adaucto Wanderley da Nóbrega (born 18 February 1939) is a Brazilian chess FIDE master (FM), Brazilian Chess Championship medalist (1970, 1972).

Biography
In the 1970s Adaucto Nóbrega was one of Brazil's leading chess players. He won two medals in Brazilian Chess Championships: silver (1970) and bronze (1972).

Adaucto Nóbrega played for Brazil in the Chess Olympiads:
 In 1970, at third board in the 19th Chess Olympiad in Siegen (+2, =4, -4),
 In 1972, at third board in the 20th Chess Olympiad in Skopje (+9, =3, -5),
 In 1974, at first reserve board in the 21st Chess Olympiad in Nice (+5, =7, -1).

In later years, Adaucto Nóbrega active participated in correspondence chess tournaments. In 1980, se was awarded the International Correspondence Chess Master (IM) title.

He is one of the founders of the Brazilian chess history site BrasilBase.

References

External links
 
 
 Adaucto da Nobrega chess games at 365chess.com

1939 births
Living people
Chess FIDE Masters
Brazilian chess players
Chess Olympiad competitors
20th-century chess players